Octavian Onofrei (born 16 May 1991) is a Moldovan football forward who plays for Spartanii Selemet.

References

1991 births
Moldovan footballers
Living people
Moldova youth international footballers
FC Iskra-Stal players
FC Costuleni players
FC Speranța Crihana Veche players
CSF Bălți players
FC Dacia Chișinău players
FC Dinamo-Auto Tiraspol players
CSF Spartanii Selemet players
Association football forwards
Moldovan Super Liga players